

M04A Antigout preparations

M04AA Preparations inhibiting uric acid production
M04AA01 Allopurinol
M04AA02 Tisopurine
M04AA03 Febuxostat
M04AA51 Allopurinol, combinations

M04AB Preparations increasing uric acid excretion
M04AB01 Probenecid
M04AB02 Sulfinpyrazone
M04AB03 Benzbromarone
M04AB04 Isobromindione
M04AB05 Lesinurad

M04AC Preparations with no effect on uric acid metabolism
M04AC01 Colchicine
M04AC02 Cinchophen

M04AX Other antigout preparations
M04AX01 Urate oxidase
M04AX02 Pegloticase

References

M04